The 2008–09 Luxembourg National Division (also known as BGL Ligue due to sponsorship reasons) was the 95th season of top-tier football in Luxembourg. It started on 2 August 2008 and ended on 24 May 2009.

F91 Dudelange successfully defended their title and qualified for the UEFA Champions League. Runners-up FC Differdange 03 and third-placed CS Grevenmacher, as well as domestic cup winners UN Käerjeng 97, will participate in the UEFA Europa League. SC Steinfort and Avenir Beggen were directly relegated while US Rumelange retained their National Division status via relegation play-off.

Team changes from 2007–08
FC Victoria Rosport and CS Pétange were relegated to the Division of Honour after finishing 13th and 14th in 2007–08. They were replaced by Division of Honour 2007–08 champions US Rumelange and runners-up CS Fola Esch.

FC Wiltz 71 as 12th-placed team had to compete in a single play-off match against 3rd-placed Division of Honour sides SC Steinfort. Steinfort won the match, 2–0, and thus gained promotion to the National Division while Wiltz were relegated as well.

Stadia and locations

League table

Results

Relegation play-offs
12th placed US Rumelange competed in a relegation play-offs match against the third placed team of Luxembourg Division of Honour, FC Erpeldange 72.

Top goalscorers
Source:

References

Luxembourg National Division seasons
Lux
1